Zoo is a 2017 British and Irish historical war family drama film directed and written by Colin McIvor. The film, based on a true story, stars Dame Penelope Wilton, Art Parkinson, Toby Jones, Ian O'Reilly, Ian McElhinney, Amy Huberman, and Damian O'Hare. As the Belfast Blitz ravages the city, a lonely widow and an awkward teenager with misfit friends take an elephant named Buster from the city zoo, and hide it in their terraced house's back yard.

Cast 
 Art Parkinson as Tom Hall
 Penelope Wilton as Denise Austin
 Toby Jones as Security Guard Charlie
 Ian McElhinney as Mr Shawcross
 Amy Huberman as Emily Hall
 Ian O'Reilly as Pete
 Emily Flain as Jane Berry
 James Stockdale as Mickey
 Stephen Hagan as Jake McClune
 Glen Nee as Vernon
 Damian O'Hare as George Hall
 Shane McCaffrey as Officer Burland

Production 
Principal photography on the film began in September 2016 in Belfast. The film is loosely based on the story of Denise Weston Austin, Belfast Zoo's 'Elephant Angel'.

Reception
On review aggregator website Rotten Tomatoes, the film holds an approval rating of 88%, based on 17 reviews, and an average rating of 7.2/10.

References

External links 
 
 

2017 films
Northern Irish films
British historical films
British war drama films
Films shot in Northern Ireland
Films set in Belfast
Films set in 1941
Films about elephants
2010s English-language films
2010s British films